Thetapapillomavirus is a genus of viruses, in the family Papillomaviridae. Birds serve as natural hosts. There is only one species in this genus: Thetapapillomavirus 1. Diseases associated with this genus include cutaneous lesions.

Structure
Viruses in Thetapapillomavirus are non-enveloped, with icosahedral geometries, and T=7 symmetry. The diameter is around 52-55 nm. Genomes are circular, around 78kb in length. The genome has 7 open reading frames.

Life cycle
Viral replication is nuclear. Entry into the host cell is achieved by attachment of the viral proteins to host receptors, which mediates endocytosis. Replication follows the dsDNA bidirectional replication model. DNA-templated transcription, with some alternative splicing mechanism is the method of transcription. The virus exits the host cell by nuclear envelope breakdown.
Birds serve as the natural host. Transmission routes are contact.

References

External links
 ICTV Report Papillomaviridae
 Viralzone: Thetapapillomavirus

Papillomavirus
Virus genera